Edward Denny may refer to:
Sir Edward Denny (soldier) (1547–1600), adventurer in Ireland, MP for Liskeard, Tregony and Westmorland
Edward Denny, 1st Earl of Norwich (1569–1637), English courtier, Member of Parliament and peer
Edward Denny (1605–1646), MP for Kerry
Edward Denny (died 1709), MP for Doneraile
Edward Denny (1652–1712), MP for Kerry
Edward Denny (1676–1727), MP for Askeaton and Kerry
Edward Denny (died 1775), soldier and MP for Tralee
Sir Edward Denny, 3rd Baronet (died 1831), MP for Tralee
Sir Edward Denny, 4th Baronet (1796–1889), composer

See also
Edward Denny Bacon (1860–1938), British philatelist